The Somua S40 was a prototype French tank developed before Second World War. It was based on the Somua S35. Compared with the latter, the S40 had a new  diesel; its hull was longer than the S35; and an extra pair of wheels was added on the suspension. The S40 also had a new turret, the ARL 2C.

Mass production was planned for the S40. However, production was canceled after the Fall of France in 1940.

References

Tanks of the interwar period
Tanks of France